Roland Bert Woolsey (born August 11, 1953) is a former professional American football cornerback in the National Football League (NFL). Drafted by the Dallas Cowboys, he also played for the Seattle Seahawks, Cleveland Browns, and St. Louis Cardinals. From rural Idaho, he played college football at Boise State University.

Early years
Born in Provo, Utah, Woolsey was raised in Grand View, Idaho, attended Grand View High School, where he competed in track, eight-man football, and basketball.

He received a track scholarship to Boise State, but eventually made his way to the football team, where he became a starter at safety and received All-Big Sky honors in 1974, after recording 72 tackles, 6 interceptions (led the team) and leading his team in punt returns. In track he set school records in the 220-yard dash, the 440-yard dash and the spring and mile relay teams. 

In 1988, he was inducted into the BSU Hall of Fame. Sports Illustrated named him one of the greatest Idaho athletes of the 20th century.

Professional career

Dallas Cowboys
Woolsey was selected by the Dallas Cowboys in the sixth round (148th overall) of the 1975 NFL Draft, also known as the Dirty Dozen draft. As a rookie, he was used mainly on special teams and became the first Boise State graduate to play in a Super Bowl.

Seattle Seahawks
The Seattle Seahawks selected him from the Cowboys roster in the 1976 NFL Expansion Draft. He missed four pre-season games with a knee injury, but was able to play in 14 games (11 starts), registering 59 tackles and 4 interceptions (tied for the team lead). His play was affected after never fully recovering from his previous knee injury and was waived on August 29, 1977.

Cleveland Browns
On September 14, he was signed by the Cleveland Browns. He was one of the NFL's leading punt returners with 32 returns for 290 yards, but was released on August 22, 1978.

St. Louis Cardinals
In December , he was signed by the St. Louis Cardinals and played in 2 games as a returner on special teams .

References

External links

 Boise State Hall of Fame bio

1953 births
Living people
People from Owyhee County, Idaho
Players of American football from Idaho
American football defensive backs
Boise State Broncos football players
Cleveland Browns players
Dallas Cowboys players
St. Louis Cardinals (football) players
Seattle Seahawks players
Woolsey family